Robert of Thourotte (died 1246) was Bishop of Langres 1232–1240, and Bishop of Liège 1240–1246.

He instituted the feast of Corpus Christi, which he ordered to be celebrated first in 1246. This was at the suggestion conveyed through his archdeacon Jacques Pantaléon of Juliana of Liège, whom he had supported in her conflict with the convent authorities.

Notes

1246 deaths
Bishops of Langres
Prince-Bishops of Liège
13th-century Roman Catholic bishops in the Holy Roman Empire
Year of birth unknown
13th-century peers of France